Draycott is a surname. Notable people with the surname include:

Billy Draycott (1869–?), English footballer
Henry Draycott ( 1510–1572), English-born Irish judge and politician
Jane Draycott, (born 1954), English poet
Mark Draycott (born 1985), English footballer

See also
 Anthony Draycot (died 1571), Roman Catholic priest